The Armstrong Whitworth Sissit, also known as the Armstrong Whitworth F.K.1, was a prototype single-engined biplane fighter aircraft of the First World War.  The first aircraft designed by Armstrong Whitworth, the Sissit was underpowered and only a single example was built.

Development and design
In 1913, the British War Office asked the engineering company Sir W G Armstrong Whitworth & Co Ltd to manufacture aeroplanes and aircraft engines for the Army, and in response to that request, Armstrong Whitworth set up an aircraft department, hiring the Dutch designer Frederick Koolhoven, formerly chief engineer of British Deperdussin as chief designer.

Koolhoven's first design for Armstrong Whitworth was a small, single-seat, aircraft  intended as a scout aircraft. A single-bay tractor biplane, the Sissit, or F.K.1 was fitted with balanced elevators and no fixed tailplane.

Although designed for an  Gnome 7 Lambda rotary engine, only a  Gnome 7 Omega could be obtained.  Fitted with this engine, it was first flown by Koolhoven in September 1914, but proved to be underpowered, and was later modified with a fixed tailplane and enlarged ailerons. As greatly superior single seat scout aircraft such as the Sopwith Tabloid and Bristol Scout were already available, no further development of the Sissit took place.

Specifications

See also

Notes

References

Bruce, J. M. British Aeroplanes 1914-18. London:Putnam, 1957. 
Mason, Francis K. The British Fighter since 1912. Annapolis, Maryland, USA: Naval Institute Press, 1992. .
Tapper, Oliver. Armstrong Whitworth Aircraft since 1914. London: Putnam, 1988. .

1910s British fighter aircraft
F.K.01
Aircraft first flown in 1914